Dummore is a surname. Notable people with the surname include:

Dave Dunmore (1934–2021), English footballer
Fred Dunmore (1911–1991), English footballer
Helen Dunmore (1952–2017), British author
John Dunmore, New Zealand historian and playwright
Laurence Dunmore, British graphic designer and film director
Russell G. Dunmore (1884–1935), American politician
Tom Dunmore, British journalist